The 1999 FIBA Americas Championship for Women, was the fifth FIBA Americas Championship for Women regional basketball championship held by FIBA Americas, which also served as Americas qualifier for the 2000 Summer Olympics, granting berths to the top three teams in the final standings. It was held in Cuba between 12 May and 17 August 1999. Eight national teams entered the event under the auspices of FIBA Americas, the sport's regional governing body. The city of Havana hosted the tournament. Cuba won their second title after defeating Brazil in the final.

Format
Teams were split into two round-robin groups of four teams each. The top two teams from each group advanced to the knockout semifinals. The winners from the semifinals competed for the championship and qualified directly to the 2000 Summer Olympics. The losing teams from the semifinals played a game for third place and the final berth to the Olympic Tournament.
The teams that did not get past the first round competed in a separate bracket to define places fifth through eighth in the final standings.

First round

Group A

|}

Group B

|}

Classification stage

Championship bracket

Seventh Place

Fifth Place

Third place game

Final

Final standings

External links
1999 Panamerican Olympic Qualifying Tournament for Women, FIBA.com. Retrieved January 22, 2015.

FIBA Women's AmeriCup
1999 in women's basketball
1999 in Cuban sport
International women's basketball competitions hosted by Cuba
1998–99 in North American basketball
1998–99 in South American basketball